Intellectual functioning refers to the "general mental ability that includes reasoning, planning, problem solving, abstract thinking, comprehending complex ideas, learning quickly and learning from experience". Significantly limited or impaired intellectual functioning characterizes intellectual disabilities.

Ageing has been shown to cause a decline in intellectual functioning.

See also 

 Human intelligence
 Intellectual disability
 Emotional or behavioral disability
 Borderline intellectual functioning
 American Association on Intellectual and Developmental Disabilities

References 

Intelligence